Wróblewo may refer to the following places in Poland:
Wróblewo, Lower Silesian Voivodeship (south-west Poland)
Wróblewo, Ciechanów County in Masovian Voivodeship (east-central Poland)
Wróblewo, Mława County in Masovian Voivodeship (east-central Poland)
Wróblewo, Płońsk County in Masovian Voivodeship (east-central Poland)
Wróblewo, Poznań County in Greater Poland Voivodeship (west-central Poland)
Wróblewo, Szamotuły County in Greater Poland Voivodeship (west-central Poland)
Wróblewo, Pomeranian Voivodeship (north Poland)